Santo António (Portuguese meaning Saint Anthony) is a village in the northeastern part of the island of Maio. It is located 18 km northeast of the island capital Porto Inglês.

See also
List of villages and settlements in Cape Verde

References
 

Villages and settlements in Maio, Cape Verde